Malaya Gribanovka is a rural locality (a selo) and the administrative center of Malogribanovskoye Rural Settlement, Gribanovsky District, Voronezh Oblast, Russia. The population was 728 as of 2010. There are 24 streets.

Geography 
Malaya Gribanovka is located 12 km northeast of Gribanovsky (the district's administrative centre) by road. Mayak is the nearest rural locality.

References 

Rural localities in Gribanovsky District